Chester R. Hardt (July 13, 1916 – January 3, 1995) was an American politician who served in the New York State Assembly from the 141st district from 1967 to 1974.

He died of a heart attack on January 3, 1995, in Pompano Beach, Florida at age 78.

References

1916 births
1995 deaths
People from Ingham County, Michigan
Republican Party members of the New York State Assembly
20th-century American politicians